Muleshoe Independent School District is a public school district based in Muleshoe, Texas (USA).

Located in Bailey County, a small portion of the district extends into Lamb County.

In 2009, the school district was rated "academically acceptable" by the Texas Education Agency.

Schools
In the 2012-2013 school year, the district had students in five schools.
Regular instructional schools
Muleshoe High School (Grades 9-12)
Watson Junior High School (Grades 6-8)
DeShazo Elementary School (Grades 3-5)
Dillman Elementary School (Grades EE-2)
Alternative instructional schools
P.E.P. (Grades 9-12)

References

External links
Muleshoe ISD

School districts in Bailey County, Texas
School districts in Lamb County, Texas